Aleksandr Anichenko (born April 14, 1975) is a pair skater who represented Azerbaijan in international competition. With former partner Inga Rodionova, he placed 18th at the 1998 Winter Olympics.

Results 
(with Rodionova)

External links
 Pairs on Ice: Rodionova & Anichenko

Azerbaijani figure skaters
Russian male pair skaters
Olympic figure skaters of Azerbaijan
Figure skaters at the 1998 Winter Olympics
Living people
1975 births